Home (家), sung by Kit Chan, was composed by Dick Lee in 1998 as the first in a series of yearly songs commissioned for Singapore's National Day Parade, together with the other NDP song that year titled as City For The World. It has English and Chinese versions, both sung by Kit. In 2004, it was remixed for three child soloists, one of whom was young actress and singer Shanice Elizabeth Nathan. The children were accompanied by a girls' choir and the piece was reused as the National Day song for 2004. In 2010, Kit performed the song at the 2010 National Day Parade. 
The song was well received, being considered one of the best National Day Songs, and is still being used in National Day Parades as of 2020.

In 2011, the music video of a new arrangement of the song was launched on Total Defence Day. Kit is the executive producer of the music video. The new arrangement was performed by 39 local singers (including Kit), accompanied by the Singapore Symphony Orchestra.

On 25 April 2020 at 7:55pm (SGT), all Mediacorp, SPH Radio and So Drama! Entertainment stations aired a rendition of Home by celebrities and musicians to commemorate the efforts of frontline and migrant workers during the COVID-19 pandemic. Another video featuring ordinary Singaporeans was aired at 10:30pm the same day.

References

1998 songs
Singaporean songs